The 1983–84 Virginia Cavaliers men's basketball team represented the University of Virginia and was a member of the Atlantic Coast Conference. Until 2019, this marked the last season the Virginia men's basketball team reached the NCAA Final Four.

Roster

Schedule 

|-
!colspan=9 style="background:#00214e; color:#f56d22;"| Regular season

|-
!colspan=9 style="background:#00214e; color:#f56d22;"| ACC Tournament

|-
!colspan=9 style="background:#00214e; color:#f56d22;"| NCAA Tournament

Awards and honors

Team players drafted into the NBA

References

Virginia Cavaliers men's basketball seasons
Virginia
NCAA Division I men's basketball tournament Final Four seasons
Virginia
Virgin
Virgin